Morlina is a genus of  small air-breathing land snails, terrestrial pulmonate gastropods in the family Oxychilidae, the glass snails.

Species
 Morlina glabra (Rossmässler, 1835)
 Morlina urbanskii (A. Riedel, 1963)

References

 Bank, R. A. (2017). Classification of the Recent terrestrial Gastropoda of the World. Last update: July 16th, 2017

External links
 

Oxychilidae
Gastropod genera